The Fisher Poets Gathering is an annual event held on the last weekend of February in Astoria, Oregon, where men and women somehow tied to the fishing industry get together to share their poems, tales, and songs in celebration of the lifestyle and its people. Begun in 1998 with a small gathering of far-flung friends meeting in a pub and sharing their poetry, the FPG has greatly expanded and now attracts around 70 artists and hundreds of audience members. The 2014 Fisher Poets Gathering marked the first time a poet from outside the United States participated, as Katrina Porteous from the Northumbrian fishing village of Beadnell, England shared her poetry about the community. It has been featured on the Today Show, in Smithsonian Magazine, and is the subject of a documentary film by Jen Winston called "Fisher Poets."

This gathering went virtual in 2021.

Notes

External links 
FPG's official homepage
Article from Smithsonian Magazine

Culture of Astoria, Oregon
Festivals in Oregon
Tourist attractions in Clatsop County, Oregon
1998 establishments in Oregon
Annual events in Oregon